The Department of English at Vienna University is, with almost 4000 students, one of the largest English departments in Europe.

History

English was not included in the curricula at the University of Vienna until 1800. The delay may be explained by religious caution as, during the 16th and 17th centuries, the university was under Jesuit dominance, firmly supporting the Catholic Church. Consequently, English was regarded as a language of Protestantism and, hence, excluded from curricula. Empress Maria Theresia declared the University of Vienna an educational establishment of the state in the 18th century. Although this reform allowed the introduction of Italian, French, Spanish, and Czech in the curricula, English was still considered as a potential transmitter of the dangerous influences of Protestant Britain and North America.

In 1800, the first teachers of English were not academics in the philological field.  Franz Pöltinger was  a civil servant and Ferdinant Zierer was a pharmacist. They did not even get salary from university funds for their services as English teachers. Instead, students paid them a voluntary fee.

In 1870, English was acknowledged as academic discipline due to the new trends in secondary education. Traditional grammar schools adhered to Latin and Greek, whereas Realschulen focused on modern languages such as English and French. In 1872, the seminar of English and French was introduced in the curricula, in which the students could not only study grammar and literature, but also practice oral and written skills.

In 1876, Jakob Schipper, professor of modern languages, held the chair of English Philology, thereby making Vienna the third university in German-speaking countries having introduced such position in English Philology.

The significance of English philology increased, because there was a practical need to teach English, which was on the way to acquire the status of lingua franca in international political and economical relations. Therefore, the number of students increased. In 1927, there were 324 students in English literature lecture. In 1928, the lecture on historical grammar was attended by 462 students., 
The historical events of 1938, when Austria became part of National Socialist Germany, influenced University life to a great extent. Many professors were dismissed and replaced due to political reasons and antisemitism. The study programmes were changed, shifting their focus to satisfy the interests of the new regime.

Students of modern languages were trained to become either teachers or interpreters before they could take PhD exams.  Future teachers had to pass many obligatory courses such as practical language classes, lectures on literature and cultural studies, phonetics, general linguistics, British and North American studies, and sometimes historical linguistics. As for the content of the subjects, the practical skills and cultural studies were of greater importance. In addition, the party was interested in training the experts on US culture to know their rivals better.
After the fall of Nazi regime, there was a process of denazification, based on the Verbotsgesetz (8 of May 1945), which was aimed on dismissal of former NSDAP members.
After the World War II, the University required considerable reconstruction which was completed in 1951.

In 1975, with the introduction of University Organisational Law, there was a democratisation of the university. Professors, readers, lecturers and students could take part in the process of making decision. The administrative structure of the whole university was changed. 
The expeditious advance in all areas of study facilitated a considerable increase in the number of subjects. Especially, since 1970 the number of students has multiplied every decade. 
This led to a progressive paucity of space and necessity for relocation. In 1988, the City Council donated the old building of the General Hospital to the University, which became Vienna University Campus, used by the Faculty of Humanities, which now consists of 15 departments. It took 10 years of reforms to adapt the old hospital for an educational use.

Research

CLIL

One of the current research focuses of the department is CLIL - Content and Language Integrated Learning. The research conducted concentrates on teaching and learning of curricular content in and through foreign or second languages. Especial attention is being paid to a discoursive-pragmatic perspective.

The research has yielded a number of MA and PhD theses, under the supervision of Prof. Christiane Dalton Puffer and Prof. Ute Smit. There are also several articles and books that have been published in the wake of the department's CLIL research, some of which can also be found in the department's journal VIEWS.

NatSide
The department also hosts the research group NatSide (Naturalist Studies in the Diachrony of English).

Fun*Cog
Fun*Cog is a research group that focusses on two approaches to the study of language and their intersections: functionalism and cognitive linguistics. The team combines the functional discourse grammar theory with a high interest in the cognitive processes underlying language production and comprehension.

Using corpora and elaborate statistical methods, the team investigates topics such as syntactic alterations, linguistic categorization, preposition and verb-preposition constructions, the English noun phrase and others.

CELT

The CELT (Centre for English Language Learning) at the department is dedicated to the teacher training program and research connected with it. Activities include pre-service teacher education, research in English language teaching and English language teacher education as well as teacher development. CELT also cooperates with other educational institutions.

VIEWS

What is Views?
Views or VIENNA ENGLISH WORKING PAPERS is an online academic journal established by the English department of university Vienna in 1992. It was launched in order to create an active linguistic community.  Its sole interest is the exchange of ideas between the Viennese scholars and the linguists from all over the world. It is also produced in print form.

Current issue
Views proved to be a successful experience as an academic forum of discussion and as a space for sharing papers of high quality. Views has contributed both locally and internationally to constructive discussions. As views was afraid of losing its interactive feature, it primarily evaluates papers according to their accessibility to an educated non-specialist readership. Once a paper is submitted, all the contributors have to revise the work, discuss it among each other and so with their authors. Therefore, a feedback would follow in the editorial discussions.

Editorial policy
The department staff wants their project to reflect their interest in open discussions rather than well-finished papers. “When we called our working papers VIEWS, this was meant to be an operative word, reflecting the intention to produce not so much finished papers as comments and opinions open-ended enough to provide a forum for discussion”. This project in fact came from a personal motivation. The staff was fed-up with their complacency. Each one of them was only interested in his study branch; no one of them dares to investigate a different branch even it belongs to the same field. ”It was easy, then, to slip into the error of thinking that we didn't have anything to say to and learn from each other. Why should a sociolinguist quarrel with a semanticist, what does the phonologist have to do with the discourse analyst, why should the historical philologist talk to the syntactitian?”

Their conversations inside the department were trivial and when it comes to linguistics the talk is restricted to either congratulations or compliments. On the other hand, the papers published by the staff in journals and conference proceedings did not receive a large public audience. The department staff in a word feared the change until they thought of this discussion forum. After four years of launching the project, the staff realized that it was somehow orientated to a space for papers more than a space for academic interaction. For that reason they decided to change their editorial policy. The editing was made open and this was even put in the print form. All sorts of papers with different lengths are all welcome to be discussed. Thus the staff insist on the contributions and discussions as a process not on papers as just a product. Views was launched as linguists of the department were looking to prove their existence in the research community and to contribute to the development of linguistics.

Archive
The views’ page provides an online archive with all the publications of the journal in PDF versions put in a chronological order and open to public. Hard copies can also be ordered from the department.

English and American Studies Library
The English Studies Library is a sublibrary of the University of Vienna library. Its origins date back to the year 1877 when Jakob Schipper made a one time donation of 400 Gulden and an annual stipend of 150 Gulden to buy a book collection for the English Seminary at Vienna University. In 1974, the American Studies section of the library is added. The year 1997 saw the move of the library to its current location.

Resources 
The library offers access to a rich stockhouse of general and specialised English and American Studies information resources, including books, journals, databases and audiovisual media. The Library is mainly a reference library but loans are possible to a certain extent.

Databases 
In order to facilitate access to subject specific databases and interdisciplinary databases relevant to English and American Studies the library offers various e-resources (such as subject relevant selections from the database service, reference and dictionaries, bibliographies, citation databases, full text databases, corporas and subject specific e-books) accessible for members of the University of Vienna only. Students or members of staff of Vienna University can also access such resources from outside by entering the University data network via VPN.

The English and American Studies Library's website offers a more detailed description.

References

University of Vienna
Research institutes in Austria